The 2019 Rhino Pro Truck Outfitters 300 is a NASCAR Xfinity Series race held on September 14, 2019, at Las Vegas Motor Speedway in Las Vegas, Nevada. Contested over 200 laps on the  asphalt intermediate speedway, it was the 26th race of the 2019 NASCAR Xfinity Series season, and the final race of the regular season before the playoffs.

Background

Track

Las Vegas Motor Speedway, located in Clark County, Nevada outside the Las Vegas city limits and about 15 miles northeast of the Las Vegas Strip, is a  complex of multiple tracks for motorsports racing. The complex is owned by Speedway Motorsports, Inc., which is headquartered in Charlotte, North Carolina.

Entry list

Practice

First practice

Final practice

Qualifying

Qualifying results

Race

Summary
Cole Custer started on pole, but Christopher Bell overtook him and proved to have the fastest car of the night. Bell won both stages and was able to prevent contenders Custer, Justin Allgaier, and Chase Briscoe from passing him on a straightaway. Tyler Reddick clinched the regular season championship after Stage 2.

A caution was thrown on lap 128 after C. J. McLaughlin slammed the turn 3 wall. Reddick pit as his car needed repairs while the leaders stayed out. Reddick went out front when the leaders made green-flag stops between laps 165 and 175 as no cautions occurred afterwards. With 25 laps remaining, Reddick's lead increased to 10 seconds, prompting him to save fuel. Bell began catching up to Reddick, closing in the gap. Ultimately, Reddick (despite his car sputtering over the last three laps) was able to hold off Bell to win the race. For the playoffs, John Hunter Nemechek and Ryan Sieg took the final two spots on points over Gray Gaulding and Jeremy Clements.

Stage Results

Stage One
Laps: 45

Stage Two
Laps: 45

Final Stage Results

Stage Three
Laps: 110

O. – Driver made the playoffs cut.

Ryan Sieg was disqualified for technical infringements, but he still made the playoffs on points.

References

NASCAR races at Las Vegas Motor Speedway
2019 in sports in Nevada
Rhino Pro Truck Outfitters 300
2019 NASCAR Xfinity Series